Jerry McGee (July 21, 1943 – March 29, 2021) was an American professional golfer who played on the PGA Tour and the Champions Tour.

McGee was born in New Lexington, Ohio. He attended Ohio State University and was a member of the golf team. He turned pro in 1966 and joined the PGA Tour in 1967.

McGee won four PGA Tour events in the latter half of the 1970s. In 1979, he won twice: a one shot win over Jerry Pate at the Kemper Open, and a couple of months later a one stroke win over Jack Renner at the Sammy Davis Jr.-Greater Hartford Open. His best finish in a major championship was T-5 at the 1972 Masters Tournament. He was a member of the 1977 Ryder Cup team.

McGee was known for his superb play around the greens. At 5 feet 9½ inches tall and a slim 160 pounds, distance in the ball striking phase of the game was a constant problem for him. He was also plagued by injuries and illnesses during his career. McGee retired from the PGA Tour in 1981 largely due to health problems. He took a club pro job at Oak Tree Country Club in Pennsylvania just across the border from his East Palestine, Ohio home.

McGee returned to competitive golf on the Senior PGA Tour in 1993 upon reaching the age of 50. His best finish in this venue is a T-2 at the 1997 BankBoston Classic. In 1999, he underwent treatment for oropharyngeal, squamous cell carcinoma.
 
McGee's son, Mike McGee, a golf agent/businessman, and one-time record-setting pitcher at Mt. Union College, is married to LPGA Tour golfer Annika Sörenstam.

McGee died March 29, 2021, in Florida at the age of 77.

Professional wins (5)

PGA Tour wins (4)

PGA Tour playoff record (0–1)

Other wins (1)
1982 Tri-State Open

Results in major championships

Note: McGee never played in The Open Championship

CUT = missed the half-way cut
"T" indicates a tie for a place
DQ = disqualified

See also
1966 PGA Tour Qualifying School graduates

References

External links

American male golfers
Ohio State Buckeyes men's golfers
PGA Tour golfers
PGA Tour Champions golfers
Ryder Cup competitors for the United States
Golfers from Ohio
People from New Lexington, Ohio
People from East Palestine, Ohio
1943 births
2021 deaths